Bradyrrhoa cantenerella is a species of snout moth in the genus Bradyrrhoa. It was described by Philogène Auguste Joseph Duponchel in 1837 and is known from Morocco and southern Europe.

The wingspan is 23–27 mm. Adults are on wing from May to September in one generation per year.

References

Phycitini
Moths described in 1837
Moths of Europe
Moths of Asia